Kal Chat (also Romanized as Kal Chāt) is a village in Howmeh Rural District, in the Central District of Iranshahr County, Sistan and Baluchestan Province, Iran. At the 2006 census, its population was 43, in 9 families.

References 

Populated places in Iranshahr County